Adam van Breen (1585 – 1642) was a Dutch Golden Age painter.

Biography
He was born in Amsterdam and specialized in winter landscapes. He became a member of the Hague Guild of St. Luke in 1612 and besides the Hague is known to have worked in Amsterdam and Oslo. He died in Norway.

References

Adam van Breen on Artnet

1585 births
1642 deaths
Dutch Golden Age painters
Dutch male painters
Painters from Amsterdam
Painters from The Hague